The Fighting Deputy is a 1937 American western directed by Sam Newfield and produced by Jed Buell for Spectrum Pictures.

Plot
Sheriff Dan Bentley (Frank LaRue) and Deputy Tom Bentley (Fred Scott) are after Scar Adams / Jim Denton (Charles King), the brother of Alice Denton (Phoebe Logan).

Tom Bentley plans to marry Alice Denton, but Sheriff Dan Bentley, Tom's father, is wounded and offers Tom the job as sheriff. Alice makes Tom refuse the job, but when Scar kills his father, Tom puts on the badge and takes off after him.

Cast
Fred Scott as Deputy Tom Bentley
Phoebe Logan as Alice Denton
Al St. John as Deputy Fuzzy
Marjorie Beebe as Peaches
Charles King as Scar Adams / Jim Denton
Frank LaRue as Sheriff Dan Bentley, Tom's Father
Eddie Holden as Axel
Lafe McKee as Frank Denton
Jack C. Smith as Jed - Posse Rider
Jack Evans as Henchman Shorty
James Sheridan as Henchman Buck
White King as White King - Tom's Horse

External links

The Fighting Deputy  is available for Streaming on oGoBoGo.

1937 films
1930s English-language films
American black-and-white films
1937 Western (genre) films
American Western (genre) films
Films directed by Sam Newfield
1930s American films